Mickey's Champs is a 1930 short film in Larry Darmour's Mickey McGuire series starring a young Mickey Rooney. Directed by Albert Herman, the two-reel short was released to theaters on February 2, 1930 by RKO.

Plot
Mickey and the Gang befriend a couple of hobos who refer to themselves as 'The Baron' and 'Earl'. The two bums are arrested after being accused of stealing two of Mayor Davis' suits (actually given to them by Stinkie Davis). Mickey believes that Mayor Davis' friend, a doctor, is the real thief. Mickey and Hambone pay the doctor a visit in order to prove that he is a fake and a crook.

Cast
Mickey Rooney - Mickey McGuire
Jimmy Robinson - Hambone Johnson
Delia Bogard - Tomboy Taylor
Marvin Stephens - Katrink
Douglas Fox - Stinkie Davis
Billy Barty - Shorty
Heinie Conklin

External links 
 

RKO Pictures short films
1930 comedy films
American black-and-white films
Mickey McGuire short film series
1930 short films
American comedy short films
1930s American films